Pureora  (known more usually as Mount Pureora to avoid confusion with the township, locality and Forest Park) is an extinct  high basaltic andesite stratovolcano located in the Pureora Forest Park between Lake Taupō and Te Kuiti on the North Island Volcanic Plateau in New Zealand. The area of the mountain is in a scenic reserve that is  "recognised as one of the finest rain forests in the world".

Geography

The mountain is covered in native forest and quite near the geographical centre of the North Island which is slightly to its west. It is located on the boundary of the Waikato and Manawatū-Whanganui regions.

Geology
It is to the south west of a smaller pleioscene  stratovolcano, Mount Titiraupenga, and both are located to the south of the ancient Mangakino caldera on a basement of Waipapa composite terrane. The basaltic andesite lavas are made up of plagioclase, clinopyroxene and orthopyroxene, with rare olivine and hornblende phenocrysts with an age of 1.60 ± 0.10 Ma.

Access
The mountain top is accessed by several trails and has bike access. These include a portion of the Te Araroa trail which incorporates the Timber trail and a branch of this called the Toi Toi track accessible off State Highway 30 near the township of Pureora.  The Mount Pureora track is accessible also from back roads off State Highway 32, which lies to the west of Lake Taupo.

See also
 List of volcanoes in New Zealand
 Pureora Forest Park

References

Volcanoes of Waikato
Mountains of Waikato
Mountains of Manawatū-Whanganui
Volcanoes of Manawatū-Whanganui
Landforms of Manawatū-Whanganui
Landforms of Waikato